The Moab uranium mill tailings pile is a uranium mill waste pond situated alongside the Colorado River, currently under the control of the U.S. Department of Energy. Locals refer to it as the Moab Tailings Pile.
In 1952 U.S. geologist Charles Steen found the largest uranium deposit in the United States near Moab, Utah. The uranium was processed by the Uranium Reduction Company and the waste slurry was stored in an unlined pond adjacent to the river. The Uranium Reduction Company was sold in 1962 and renamed the Atlas Uranium Mill.

After the mill was closed in 1984 the pond was capped. It is believed that pollutants from the waste tailings are leaching into the river, inferred from the lethal effect on fish, primarily from high concentrations of ammonia. The site was transferred to the United States Department of Energy for remediation under Title 1 of the Uranium Mill Tailings Radiation Control Act in 2001. In August 2005 the Department of Energy announced that 11.9 million short tons (10.8 million tonnes) of radioactive tailings would be moved, mostly by rail, and buried in a lined hole. In February 2006 a final Environmental Impact Statement met with United States Environmental Protection Agency approval. The cost of the relocation was originally estimated to be $300 million, but 2008 Department of Energy estimates are in excess of $720 million.

The contract for the first transfer of the tailings has been awarded and the first relocation is expected to occur in late 2008. A series of works to extract and evaporate the water and ammonia from the pile before it reaches the Colorado River has been completed.

The tailings pile left untouched until the late 2010s. Trace amounts of uranium contamination were found in the Colorado River. The tailings were at risk of contaminating the Californian water supply and cleanup promptly began. However, the tailings were not fully removed before trace amounts of uranium were spread across the Great Basin Desert.

DOE plan for relocation

The current Department of Energy plan to move the tailings is contracted out to Portage-North Wind LLC who has begun hauling the tailings from the current Atlas Uranium Mill site to the tiny town of Crescent Junction, Utah by railroad. This plan is based on the most current funding schedule which will provide for a complete removal by 2028.

A series of amendments to the Defense Authorization Act, sponsored by Rep. Jim Matheson are attempting to move the completion date to 2019. If these become law, the rate of removal would be doubled.

According to the current plan, huge "dirty" trucks pull 40-ton containers filled with tailings to a structure that will be located between the talings and Potash Road. Once in the structure the containers would be covered by lids. A radiological survey verifies that they have no radioactive material on the outside, and the containers will then be hauled by "clean" trucks up to a railroad line to be placed on rail cars for the transportation to the disposal site near Crescent Junction. Dirty trucks will never travel to the clean side of the lidding structure, and clean trucks will never be on the dirty side.

Once at Crescent Junction the process will be reversed, with the exception that the tailings will be dumped out of end gates rather than from the top to minimize dust as well as prevent contamination to the outside containers. A knife-edge seal will be employed to ensure no materials dribble out of the end gates during the transfer.

Six clean trucks will make 22 to 23 loops per day, on a 21.2-minute cycle, between the lidding area and the rail line. About 136 containers will be transported daily with a four-day-per-week schedule.

An overpass is to be built across Potash Road so haul trucks will never encounter highway traffic.

Rail shipments began in April 2009.  The clean trucks were replaced by the rail line, with the containers still needed to be lidded as before.  On March 3, 2010, the Department of Energy announced it had shipped one million tons of tailings.

As of September 2019, 10 million tons of tailing (62%) have been removed. A well field is located between the tailing pile and the river, which extracts and purifies groundwater before it enters the Colorado river. During low water periods, fresh water is injected into the wells. On July 29, 2014 the 7 millionth ton of tailing was placed in the disposal cell.

Planned cleanup scope 2021-2031 
"Over the next several years, DOE expects to ship nearly one million tons of uranium mill tailings annually to the Crescent Junction disposal site. As a result, DOE expects to complete the relocation and disposal of the pile by CY 2029. It will take an additional two years to complete the restoration of the Moab Site, dispose of potentially contaminated equipment and intermodal containers, and to install the cover on the disposal cell."

"DOE also plans to continue transportation and disposal of oversize debris from the Moab Site, including 14 autoclaves decommissioned by the Atlas Minerals Corporation. They are assumed to weigh at least 40 tons each and could be filled with asbestos. Transportation of oversize debris will continue through CY 2028."

Disposal site
The tailings and other contaminated material are being buried near Crescent Junction, Utah, northeast of the junction of Interstate 70 and U.S. Route 191, about 30 miles from the tailing pile. Excavation occurs in phases, two of which are complete as of July 2014. Cover material is sourced locally and from Fremont Junction, Utah.

Currently the DOE owns  of land and has another  in a 20-year withdrawal for the disposal cell, buffer space, support area, and access road.

References

External links
Grand County Official Website, Moab UMTRA Project
Decommissioning of Moab, Utah, Uranium Mill Tailings

Geography of Grand County, Utah
Uranium mining in the United States
Moab, Utah
Mining in Utah